China first entered World Cup qualification in 1957 in an attempt to qualify for the 1958 FIFA World Cup and has made its only appearance in 2002.

Overall record

FIFA World Cup squads and matches

2002 South Korea/Japan

Squads

Record players
Eight players were fielded in all three of China PR's World Cup matches in 2002.

References

External links 
 FIFA Official Ranking of all Participants at Finals 1930–2002. FIFA Match Results for all Stages 1930–2002
 FIFA official site

China at the FIFA World Cup
Countries at the FIFA World Cup
FIFA